Klaukkala church is a copper-plated modern church in Klaukkala of the Nurmijärvi municipality, built in 2004. The church was designed by Anssi Lassila; interior furniture and lamps were designed by interior architect Antti Paatero and liturgical textiles by Hanna Korvela. Mikko Heikka, a bishop of the Evangelic Lutheran Church, dedicated it on November 28, 2004. Construction claimed one death when a worker fell from the roof.

Klaukkala Church was awarded the "Concrete of the Year" honorable mention in 2004.

See also 
 Nurmijärvi church

References

External links 

Lutheran churches in Finland
Buildings of Nurmijärvi